Current Science is an English-language peer-reviewed multidisciplinary scientific journal. It was established in 1932 and is published by the Current Science Association along with the Indian Academy of Sciences. According to the Journal Citation Reports, the journal has a 2018 impact factor of 0.756. Current Science is indexed by Web of Science, Current Contents, Geobase, Chemical Abstracts, IndMed and Scopus. The editor-in-chief is S. K. Satheesh of the Indian Institute of Science, Bengaluru.

References

External links
 
 Book Review Current Science Early Indians

Semi-monthly journals
English-language journals
Multidisciplinary scientific journals
Publications established in 1932